John Lewis Gaddis (born 1941) is an American international relations scholar, military historian, and writer. He is the Robert A. Lovett Professor of Military and Naval History at Yale University. He is best known for his work on the Cold War and grand strategy, and he has been hailed as the "Dean of Cold War Historians" by The New York Times. Gaddis is also the official biographer of the seminal 20th-century American statesman George F. Kennan. George F. Kennan: An American Life (2011), his biography of Kennan, won the 2012 Pulitzer Prize for Biography or Autobiography.

Biography 
Gaddis was born in Cotulla, Texas, in 1941. He attended the University of Texas at Austin, receiving his BA in 1963, MA in 1965, and PhD in 1968, the latter under the direction of Robert Divine. Gaddis then taught briefly at Indiana University Southeast, before joining The Ohio University in 1969. At Ohio, he founded and directed the Contemporary History Institute, and was named a distinguished professor in 1983.

In the 1975–77 academic years, Gaddis was a visiting professor of Strategy at the Naval War College. In the 1992–93 academic year, he was the Harmsworth Visiting professor of American History at Oxford. He has also held visiting positions at Princeton University and the University of Helsinki. He served as president of the Society for Historians of American Foreign Relations in 1992.

In 1997, he moved to Yale University to become the Lovett Professor of Military and Naval History. In the 2000–01 academic year, Gaddis was the George Eastman Professor at Oxford, the second scholar (after Robin Winks) to have the honor of being both Eastman and Harmsworth professor. In 2005, he received the National Humanities Medal. He sits on the advisory committee of the Wilson Center's Cold War International History Project, which he helped establish in 1991. Gaddis is also known for his close relationship with the late George Kennan and his wife, whom Gaddis described as "my companions".

Scholarship 
Gaddis is probably the best known historian writing in English about the Cold War. Perhaps his most famous work is the highly influential Strategies of Containment (1982; rev. 2005), which analyzes in detail the theory and practice of containment that was employed against the Soviet Union by Cold War American presidents, but his 1983 distillation of post-revisionist scholarship similarly became a major channel for guiding subsequent Cold War research.

We Now Know (1997)  presented an analysis of the Cold War through to the Cuban Missile Crisis that incorporated new archival evidence from the Soviet bloc. Fellow historian Melvyn Leffler named it as "likely to set the parameters for a whole new generation of scholarship". It was also praised as "the first coherent and sustained attempt to write the Cold War's history since it ended." Nonetheless, Leffler observed that the most distinctive feature of We Now Know is the extent to which Gaddis "abandons post-revisionism and returns to a more traditional interpretation of the Cold War."

The Cold War (2005), praised by John Ikenberry as a "beautifully written panoramic view of the Cold War, full of illuminations and shrewd judgments," was described as an examination of the history and effects of the Cold War in a more removed context than had been previously possible, and won Gaddis the 2006 Harry S. Truman Book Prize. Critics were less impressed, with Tony Judt summarising the book as "a history of America's cold war: as seen from America, as experienced in America, and told in a way most agreeable to many American readers," and David S. Painter writing that it was a "carefully crafted defense of US policy and policymakers" that was "not comprehensive."

His 2011 biography of George Kennan garnered multiple prizes, including a Pulitzer.

John Nagl, in the Wall Street Journal, wrote of Gaddis's 2018 book On Grand Strategy as "a book that should be read by every American leader or would-be leader".

Gaddis is known for arguing that Soviet leader Joseph Stalin's personality and role in history constituted one of the most important causes of the Cold War. Within the field of U.S. diplomatic history, he was originally most associated with the concept of post-revisionism, the idea of moving past the revisionist and orthodox interpretations of the origins of the Cold War to embrace what were (in the 1970s) interpretations based upon the then-growing availability of government documents from the United States, Great Britain and other western government archives.  Due to his growing focus on Stalin and leanings toward US nationalism, Gaddis is now widely seen as more orthodox than post-revisionist. The revisionist Bruce Cumings had a high-profile debate with Gaddis in the 1990s, where Cumings criticized Gaddis as moralistic and lacking in objectivity.

Political positions
Gaddis is close to President George W. Bush, making suggestions to his speech writers, and has been described as an "overt admirer" of the 43rd President. After leaving office, Bush took up painting as a hobby at Gaddis's recommendation.

During the US invasion of Iraq, Gaddis argued: "The world now must be made safe for democracy, and this is no longer just an idealistic issue; it's an issue of our own safety." During the United States occupation of Iraq, Gaddis asserted that Bush had established America "as a more powerful and purposeful actor within the international system than it had been on September 11, 2001." Historian James Chace argues that Gaddis supports an "informal imperial policy abroad." Gaddis believes that preventive war is a constructive part of American tradition, and that there is no meaningful difference between preventive and pre-emptive war.

About the Trump presidency he has said, "We may have been overdue for some reconsideration of the whole political system. There are times when the vision is not going to come from within the system and the vision is going to come from outside the system. And maybe this is one of those times."

Quotes 
 "Stalin's postwar goals were security for himself, his regime, his country, and his ideology, in precisely that order."
 "Assuming stability is one of the ways ruins get made. Resilience accommodates the unexpected."
 "Learning about the past liberates the learner from oppressions earlier constructions of the past have imposed upon them."
 "[A]lthough the past is never completely knowable, it is more knowable than the future."
 "Common sense, in this sense, is like oxygen: the higher you go, the thinner it gets."

Awards and distinctions 

 2012 – Pulitzer Prize for Biography or Autobiography
 2012 – American History Book Prize
 2011 – National Book Critics Circle Award, Biography
 2006 – Harry S. Truman Book Award
 2005 – National Humanities Medal
 2003 – Yale Phi Beta Kappa DeVane Medalist for undergraduate teaching
 2000 – Eastman Professor at the University of Oxford
 1996 – Fulbright Scholar to Poland
 1995 – Fellowship of the American Academy of Arts and Sciences
 1995 – Wilson Center Fellowship
 1993 – Whitney H. Shepardson Fellowship
 1992 – Harmsworth Professor of American History at the University of Oxford
 1992 – Presidency of the Society for Historians of American Foreign Relations
 1986 – Guggenheim Fellowship
 1983 – Distinguished Professor of Ohio University
 1980 – Fulbright Scholar to Finland
 1973 – Bancroft Prize
 1973 – National Historical Society Prize
 1973 – Stuart L. Bernath Prize

Selected publications

Books 

 
 
  US edition UK edition

Articles and chapters

See also 
 Containment
 Historiography of the Cold War

References

Bibliography

External links

 
 John Lewis Gaddis Papers (MS 2092). Manuscripts and Archives, Yale University Library.

1941 births
Living people
American male non-fiction writers
American military historians
Bancroft Prize winners
Cold War historians
Harold Vyvyan Harmsworth Professors of American History
Historians of American foreign relations
National Humanities Medal recipients
Naval War College faculty
People from Cotulla, Texas
Pulitzer Prize for Biography or Autobiography winners
University of Texas at Austin College of Liberal Arts alumni
Writers from Texas
Yale Sterling Professors
Yale University faculty
Fulbright alumni